The Men's Triple Jump event at the 2005 World Championships in Athletics was held at the Helsinki Olympic Stadium on August 10 and August 11.

Medalists

Qualification

Group A
 Yoandri Betanzos, Cuba 17.40m Q
 Leevan Sands, Bahamas 17.21m Q (SB)
 Walter Davis, United States 17.08m Q
 Marian Oprea, Romania 16.81m q
 Anders Møller, Denmark 16.69m q
 Dmitriy Valyukevich, Slovakia 16.68m q
 Karl Taillepierre, France 16.67m q
 Vyktor Yastrebov, Ukraine 16.66m q
 Nelson Évora, Portugal 16.60m
 Viktor Gushchinskiy, Russia 16.39m
 Danila Burkenaya, Russia 16.35m
 Kazuyoshi Ishikawa, Japan 16.33m
 Johan Meriluoto, Finland 16.01m
 Konstadinos Zalaggitis, Greece 15.72m
 Michael Velter, Belgium NM

Group B
 Jadel Gregório, Brazil 17.20m Q
 Momchil Karailiev, Bulgaria 16.73m q
 Kenta Bell, United States 16.72m q
 Arnie David Giralt, Cuba 16.71 q
 Allen Simms, Puerto Rico 16.63m
 Nathan Douglas, Great Britain 16.53m
 Igor Spasovkhodskiy, Russia 16.45m
 Tarik Bougtaïb, Morocco 16.38m
 Mykola Savolainen, Ukraine 16.35m
 Hristos Meletoglou, Greece 16.35m
 Paolo Camossi, Italy 16.23
 Randy Lewis, Grenada 16.11
 Charles Friedek, Germany 15.75m
 Yanxi Li, China NM

Final
Walter Davis, United States 17.57 m SB
Yoandri Betanzos, Cuba 17.42 m SB
Marian Oprea, Romania 17.40 m
Leevan Sands, Bahamas 17.39 m
Karl Taillepierre, France 17.27 m
Jadel Gregório, Brazil 17.20 m
Kenta Bell, United States 17.11 m SB
Arnie David Giralt, Cuba 17.09 m
Vyktor Yastrebov, Ukraine 16.90 m
Dmitriy Valyukevich, Slovakia 16.79 m
Momchil Karailiev, Bulgaria 16.70 m
Anders Møller, Denmark 16.16 m

External links
Results – groups 
Results – final 

Triple jump
Triple jump at the World Athletics Championships